Herwin Tri Saputra (born 10 January 1991) is an Indonesian professional footballer who plays as a centre-back for Liga 1 club RANS Nusantara.

Club career

PS TIRA
He was signed for PS TIRA to play in Liga 1 in the 2018 season. Herwin made his league debut on 30 April 2018 in a match against Bali United at the Sultan Agung Stadium, Bantul.

Persita Tangerang
In 2021, Herwin signed a contract with Indonesian Liga 1 club Persita Tangerang. He made his debut on 22 October 2021 in a match against Persikabo 1973. On 6 November 2021, Herwin scored his first goal for Persita against Madura United in the 91st minute at the Moch. Soebroto Stadium, Magelang.

RANS Nusantara
Herwin was signed for RANS Nusantara to play in Liga 1 in the 2022–23 season. He made his league debut on 6 December 2022 in a match against Persis Solo at the Maguwoharjo Stadium, Sleman.

References

External links
 Herwin Saputra at Soccerway
 Herwin Saputra at Liga Indonesia

1991 births
Living people
Indonesian footballers
Liga 1 (Indonesia) players
Bhayangkara F.C. players
Gresik United players
Mitra Kukar players
Persikabo 1973 players
Persita Tangerang players
RANS Nusantara F.C. players
Association football defenders
People from Makassar
Sportspeople from Makassar
Sportspeople from South Sulawesi
20th-century Indonesian people
21st-century Indonesian people